Balengah (also Romanized as Bālengāh; also known as Bālanak, Bālengā, and Bālenkā) is a village in Rahimabad Rural District, Rahimabad District, Rudsar County, Gilan Province, Iran. At the 2006 census, its population was 891, in 255 families.

References 

Populated places in Rudsar County